Prunus tianshanica, the Tianshan cherry, is a species of cherry native to the Tianshan Mountains of Central Asia, preferring to grow at 800-1000m.

Description
Prunus tianshanica is a shrub reaching . The bark is grey, turning browner with age. The flowers are pink, and the dark red fruits, although small, are high in sugar and pleasant to the taste. It hybridizes naturally with Prunus cerasifera, and the offspring produce fruit. A phylogenetic reconstruction using twelve chloroplast loci and three nuclear genes of 84 species of Prunus shows that Cerasus is indisputably a synonym (and subgenus) of Prunus and that Cerasus tianshanica is properly Prunus tianshanica.

Notes

References

tianshanica
tianshanica
Cherries
Flora of Central Asia
Plants described in 1939